The men's 60 metres hurdles event at the 2017 European Athletics Indoor Championships was held on 3 March 2017 at 16:45 (heats), and at 20:10 (final) local time.

Medalists

Records

Results

Heats
Qualification: First 2 in each heat (Q) and the next 2 fastest (q) advance to the Final.

Final

References

2017 European Athletics Indoor Championships
60 metres hurdles at the European Athletics Indoor Championships